Pershing may refer to:

Military
 John J. Pershing (1860–1948), U.S. General of the Armies
 MGM-31 Pershing, U.S. ballistic missile system
 Pershing II Weapon System, U.S. ballistic missile
 M26 Pershing, U.S. tank
 Pershing boot, a type of boot used by U.S. soldiers in World War I
 Pershing Rifles, U.S. college military fraternal organization founded 1894

Companies
 Pershing, an Italian yachtbuilding company, part of the Ferretti Group as of 2004
 Pershing LLC, a financial brokerage and custodian, and a subsidiary of the Bank of New York Mellon

Places
France
 Stade Pershing (Pershing Stadium), a stadium in Vincennes, France
United States
 Pershing, Indiana
 Pershing, Oklahoma
 Pershing, Wisconsin, a town
 Pershing County, Nevada
 Pershing Center, an arena in Lincoln, Nebraska
 Pershing Park, a small park in Washington, D.C.
 Pershing Road (Hudson County), a road along the face of the Hudson Palisades
 Pershing Township (disambiguation)

Other
 Andrzej Kolikowski (1954–1999), nicknamed Pershing, a Polish mobster
 Pershing (album), an album by indie pop/rock band Someone Still Loves You Boris Yeltsin
 Pershing (doughnut), a type of doughnut
 General Pershing (motor ship), a five masted bald-headed schooner
 Pershing High School, Detroit, Michigan
 Pershing Middle School (San Diego), San Diego, California
 Louise Pershing (1904–1986), American artist

See also
 Pershing Square (disambiguation)
 Persian (roll)